"Human" is a song by British electronic music duo Goldfrapp. The song was written by the group with Startled Insects' Tim Norfolk and Bob Locke, and produced by Alison Goldfrapp and Will Gregory for the duo's debut album Felt Mountain (2000).  "Human" is the only track on Felt Mountain with additional songwriters.  It was released as the album's third single on 26 February 2001 and reached number 87 on the UK Singles Chart.

The song was sampled by American rapper Kanye West for his track "Freestyle 4". It was also used in the closing credits of the second season of the French spy show The Bureau.

Critical response
"Human" received generally positive reviews from pop music critics. Flak Magazine reviewer Eric Wittmershaus called the song a "surprisingly-daring-yet-easy-to-listen-to genre-bender" that "is easily the disc's standout track." Sacha Esterson of Musicomh.com described the track as "middle eastern-influenced upbeat gem" that is "particularly fantastic." NME wrote that "Human" "sounds like Shirley Bassey, but with none of the dance nous the Welsh warbler brought to her collaboration with the Propellerheads."

Formats and track listings

 CD single (UK)
"Human" (Single Version) – 3:44
"Human" (Calexico Vocal) – 4:50
"Human" (Massey's Cro-Magnon Mix) – 5:54

 12-inch single (UK)
"Human" (Single Version) – 3:44
"Human" (Calexico Instrumental) – 4:48
"Human" (Massey's Neanderthal Mix) – 7:27

 Digital single
"Human" (Single Version) – 3:43
"Human" (Calexico Vocal) – 4:49
"Human" (Massey's Cro-Magnon Mix) – 5:53
"Human" (Calexico Instrumental) – 4:47
"Human" (Massey's Neanderthal Mix) – 7:29

Charts

References

External links
 Goldfrapp.com

2000 songs
2001 singles
Goldfrapp songs
Mute Records singles
Songs written by Alison Goldfrapp
Songs written by Will Gregory